The Mount Dall Formation is a geologic formation in Alaska. It preserves fossils dating back to the Permian period.

See also

 List of fossiliferous stratigraphic units in Alaska
 Paleontology in Alaska

References

Further reading
David Sunderlin, The flora, fauna, and sediments of the Mount Dall Conglomerate (Farewell Terrane, Alaska, USA). (2008) https://doi.org/10.1130/2008.442(09)

Permian Alaska